Kurt Henrik Mikael Borgström (born 6 August 1997) is a Finnish professional ice hockey player who is currently playing with the Hershey Bears in the American Hockey League (AHL) while under contract with the Washington Capitals in the National Hockey League (NHL). He also played two seasons for the University of Denver in the National Collegiate Hockey Conference (NCHC). Borgström was an all-American at Denver and led the Pioneers to the 2017 NCAA Championship. Borgström was selected 23rd overall in the 2016 NHL Entry Draft by the Florida Panthers.

Playing career
Prior to his career at Denver, Borgström played in his native Finland within the junior program of the HIFK organization. Borgström committed to playing for the Denver Pioneers prior to the NHL Entry Draft. Ranked as a potential 3rd-round pick, Borgström ended up being selected 23rd overall in the 2016 NHL Entry Draft by the Florida Panthers, his second eligible NHL draft. At the end of the 2017–18 season, he was named a Hobey Baker Award finalist, and a First-Team West All-American.

On 26 March 2018, Borgström signed an entry-level contract with the Panthers. He made his NHL debut in an overtime loss to the Ottawa Senators on 29 March. Borgström's first NHL goal was the first of four Panthers goals in their last game of the season, a 4–2 win over the Boston Bruins, on 8 April 2018.

Unable to come to terms with the Panthers as a restricted free agent and with the 2020–21 season, set to be delayed through the COVID-19 pandemic, Borgström opted to return to his original Finnish club, signing a one-year contract with HIFK of the Liiga, on 4 October 2020. Approaching the playoffs with HIFK, on 8 April 2021, Borgström's NHL rights' were traded by the Panthers alongside Brett Connolly, Riley Stillman, and a 2021 7th round draft pick to the Chicago Blackhawks in exchange for Lucas Carlsson and Lucas Wallmark.

On 12 May 2021, as a restricted free agent, Borgström agreed to a two-year, $2 million contract with the Chicago Blackhawks. In the  season, Borgström appeared in a career high 52 regular season games with the Blackhawks, however was unable to find his offensive touch in contributing with just 4 goals and 7 points.

On 11 July 2022, Borgström was placed on unconditional waivers by the Blackhawks for the purpose of buying out the remaining year on his contract, he was released as a free agent the following day. On 14 July 2022, Borgström was signed to a one-year, two-way contract to join the Washington Capitals for the  season.

Career statistics

Regular season and playoffs

International

Awards and honors

References

External links

1997 births
Living people
AHCA Division I men's ice hockey All-Americans
Chicago Blackhawks players
Denver Pioneers men's ice hockey players
Florida Panthers draft picks
Florida Panthers players
Finnish ice hockey centres
Hershey Bears players
HIFK (ice hockey) players
National Hockey League first-round draft picks
Springfield Thunderbirds players
Ice hockey people from Helsinki